German submarine U-428 was a Type VIIC U-boat of Nazi Germany's Kriegsmarine during World War II.

She carried out no patrols. She did not sink or damage any ships.

She was scuttled in northern Germany on 5 May 1945. The wreck was broken up in 1946.

Design
German Type VIIC submarines were preceded by the shorter Type VIIB submarines. U-428 had a displacement of  when at the surface and  while submerged. She had two shafts and two  propellers.

U-428 was fitted with five  torpedo tubes (four fitted at the bow and one at the stern), fourteen torpedoes, one  SK C/35 naval gun, 220 rounds, and two twin  C/30 anti-aircraft guns. The boat had a complement of between forty-four and sixty.

Service history
The submarine was laid down on 13 August 1942 at the Danziger Werft (yard) at Danzig (now Gdansk), as yard number 129, launched on 11 March 1943 and commissioned on 26 June under the command of Capitano di Corvetta Athos Fraternale.

She served with the 8th U-boat Flotilla from 26 June 1943 and the 23rd flotilla from 1 October. She was reassigned to the 31st flotilla on 1 March 1945.

The U-boat was named S-1 after being acquired by the Italian Navy in exchange for some transport ships. She returned to Germany after the Italian surrender where she was renamed U-428.

Fate
The submarine was scuttled in the Kiel canal near Audorf on 5 May 1945. The wreck was broken up in 1946.

References

Bibliography

External links

German Type VIIC submarines
U-boats commissioned in 1943
1943 ships
Ships built in Danzig
World War II submarines of Germany
Operation Regenbogen (U-boat)
Maritime incidents in May 1945